Makhdum Shah Daulah was a thirteenth-century Sufi Muslim figure in present-day Bangladesh. He is associated with the spread of Islam into the Sirajganj District. He was martyred in Shahzadpur (meaning city of the prince), an area named after him.

Background
Makhdum Shah was a descendant of Muadh ibn Jabal, and he was the second son of a ruler in Yemen.

Life
His Pir Murshid was Shams Tabrizi (who was also the Murshid of Rumi, author of the famous Musnavi Sharif). Together with some twenty companions, he travelled east by the land route through Bukhara and into the subcontinent preaching Islam. In Bukhara, he met Jalaluddin Surkh-Posh Bukhari and spent some time with him. Bukhari presented Daulah with a pair of gray pigeons. Eventually they settled in Shahzadpur, at the time part of a Hindu kingdom ruled by Raja Vikrama Keshari.

Death
The king was displeased with the disruption caused by Makhdum Shah and his followers and ordered them expelled from his kingdom.  Makhdum Shah refused to comply and he and nearly all of his followers were killed. Makhdum Shah is buried in Shahzadpur in Sirajganj District, near the Shahi mosque.

References

 Wali, Maclavi Abdul (January 1904) "On the Antiquity and Traditions of Shahzadpur" Journal of the Asiatic Society of Bengal: January to December 1904, Calcutta, p. 2, at https://books.google.com/books?vid=LCCN08000086&id=kEAOAAAAIAAJ
 Haq, Muhammad Enamul (1975) A History of Sufi-ism in Bengal Asiatic Society of Bangladesh, Dacca;
 Karim, Abdul (1959) Social History of Muslims in Bengal, down to A.D. 1538 Asiatic Society of Pakistan, Dacca;

Indian people of Arab descent
13th-century Yemeni people
14th-century Indian Muslims
Sufi mystics
1313 deaths
Bengali Sufi saints
People from Sirajganj District